Oleh Viktorovych Vyshnevskyi (born 4 October 1995) is a Ukrainian professional footballer who plays as a right winger for Mynai.

References

External links
 Profile on Mynai official website
 
 

1995 births
Living people
People from Perechyn
Ukrainian Premier League players
Ukrainian Second League players
2. Liga (Slovakia) players
3. Liga (Slovakia) players
MFK Snina players
FC Košice (2018) players
FC Uzhhorod players
FC Mynai players
Association football forwards
Ukrainian footballers
Ukrainian expatriate footballers
Expatriate footballers in Slovakia
Ukrainian expatriate sportspeople in Slovakia
Sportspeople from Zakarpattia Oblast